Mala Vas pri Grosupljem is a village just north of Šent Jurij in the Municipality of Grosuplje in central Slovenia. The area is part of the historical region of Lower Carniola. The municipality is now included in the Central Slovenia Statistical Region.

Name
The name of the settlement was changed from Mala vas to Mala vas pri Grosupljem in 1990.

Gallery

References

External links

Mala Vas pri Grosupljem on Geopedia

Populated places in the Municipality of Grosuplje